Corydoras leopardus, the leopard cory, is a catfish very similar to, and often confused with, the three line cory, Corydoras trilineatus. The most obvious differences are that C. leopardus has a longer, more pointed snout than C. trilineatus, and C. leopardus grows larger than C. trilineatus.

References

Corydoras
Fish described in 1933